The  Photron FASTCAM Ultima 512  is a 512 × 512 high-speed camera.  It is part of the Photron FASTCAM line of cameras. The Photron FASTCAM Ultima 512 was introduced in 2001.

Overview and features
The FASTCAM Ultima 512 native resolution is 512 × 512 pixels × 10 bits at 2000 FPS.  By reducing  the resolution, the frame rate for recording can be increased. As an example, 32,000 FPS is achieved with a resolution of 512 × 32 pixels at 10 bits. The FASTCAM Ultima 512 processor came with two memory configurations that allowed full frame storage of 2048 images (670 MB) or 6144 images (2 GB). At 2048 fps and maximum memory, the recording time is 1.02 seconds.  The Ultima 512 CMOS image sensor is what is called a camera-on-chip, full digital output. The sensor is a Photobit MV02, digital image data could be read from the processor through an optical fiber, Ethernet, or FireWire interface. Live video images could be displayed on NTSC or PAL monitors. Ancillary information would be display as OSD (on-screen-data).  The camera cable can be up to 15 metres from the processor. The system has a keypad for controlling the camera.

The FASTCAM Ultima 512 has been used in ballistic studies, car crash studies (off-board), flow visualization studies such as aerosol dispersion and many other high-speed camera applications.

See also 
 Photron (Photron's FASTCAM high-speed cameras)
 High-speed photography
 High-speed camera

References

External links
 Official website (Photron)
  (FASTCAM Ultima 512)
  (Rolling vs. Global Shutter)
    (Electronic Imaging)
  (US 4322638 A - Image Ultima 512nsor adaptable for fast frame readout)

High-speed cameras
Digital movie cameras